The Basketball Federation of Kosovo (Albanian: Federata e Basketbollit e Kosovës, /Košarkaški savez Kosova) is the governing body of basketball in Kosovo. It organizes the Kosovo Basketball Superleague and the Kosovo Basketball Cup. It has also fielded a team which has represented Kosovo in international friendlies.

History
Kosovo Basketball Federation was founded in 1991. During the Yugoslavian era, Kosovo had own Superleague and lower divisions in both genders. In the 1990s, Kosovo declared political and sports independence from Yugoslavian system, organising its own league based with different teams from major cities of Kosovo. Kosovo was not allowed to play international matches, not even friendlies by FIBA, until 2015 when Kosovo Basketball Federation became official member of FIBA World and FIBA Europe. 

Initially the Basketball Federation of Kosovo was  denied entry into the International Basketball Federation (FIBA), the last rejection taking place in Beijing at the annual FIBA Central Board meeting on 26 April 2008, with the reason: "Kosovo has not fulfilled all required conditions". 

The Basketball Federation of Kosovo was accepted as a full member of FIBA on 13 March 2015. Serbian basketball federation KSS seeks to ban any Kosovo vs Serbia games.

Kosovo competitions

Men
 Kosovo Basketball Superleague
 Kosovo Basketball First League
 Kosovo Cup
 Kosovo Basketball Second League
 TEB U21 League
 TEB U18 League
 TEB U16 League
 TEB U12 League (Group A&Group B)

Women
 Kosovo Women's Basketball Superleague

International competitions

Senior teams
 Men's national team
 Women's national team

Youth teams
 Kosovo national under-20 basketball team
 Kosovo national under-18 basketball team
 Kosovo national under-16 basketball team
 Kosovo national under-14 basketball team

See also
Kosovo national basketball team

Notes

References

External links
 

Basketball in Kosovo
Sports governing bodies in Kosovo
Mace
Sports organizations established in 1991
1991 establishments in Yugoslavia